Mallinatha (Prakrit Mallinātha, "Lord of jasmine or seat") was the 19th tīrthaṅkara "ford-maker" of the present avasarpiṇī age in Jainism. Jain texts indicate Mālliṇātha was born at Mithila into the Ikshvaku dynasty to King Kumbha and Queen Prajnavati. Tīrthaṅkara Māllīnātha lived for over 56,000 years, out of which 54,800 years less six days, was with omniscience (Kevala Jnana).

Mallinatha is believed to be a woman named Malli Devi by Shvetambara Jains while the Digambara sect believes all 24 tirthankara to be men including Māllīnātha. Digambara tradition believes a woman can reach to the 16th heaven and can attain liberation only being reborn as a man. Digambara tradition says Mallinatha was a son born in a royal family, and worships Mallinatha as a male. However, the Shvetambara tradition of Jainism states that Māllīnātha was female with a name Malli bai.

According to Jain beliefs, Mālliṇātha became a siddha, a liberated soul which has destroyed all of its karma.

Literature
Jnatrdharmakathah gives the story of Lord Mallinath, which is said to be composed by Ganadhara Sudharmaswami.
Mallinathapurana was written by Nagachandra in 1105 CE.

Main temples
Mannargudi Mallinatha Swamy Jain Temple is a Jain temple in Mannargudi, an ancient town in the erstwhile Chola Empire of Tamil Nadu.
Chaturmukha Basadi is a famous Jain temple located at Karkala in the Indian state of Karnataka. The temple is dedicated to Tirthankar Aranatha, Mallinath and Munisuvratnathswami.
Sri Mallinath Jain Derasar, near Bhoyani,Viramgam Taluk,Gujarat.

See also

 God in Jainism
 Jainism and non-creationism

References

Citations

Sources
 
 
 
 
 

 
 
 
  

Tirthankaras
Jainism in Mithila